Heinrich Belohlavek (26 September 1889 – 2 March 1943) was an Austrian amateur footballer who played as a midfielder. He died as a political prisoner of Nazi Germany in the Second World War.

Football career

He made one appearance for the Austria national team in 1910.

Life outside football

Belohlavek was an industrial iron turner by trade, who served in the First World War in the depot of a railway regiment of the Austro-Hungarian Army. He was a member of the Austrian Social Democratic Party until its abolition in 1934. He was an opponent of the Austrofascist regime, under which he was detained on suspicion of 'Marxist activity' and later of the Nazi German authority following the Anschluss of 1938. In 1941 he was arrested for running a cell of the outlawed Austrian Communist Party in his factory workplace when caught collecting funds (which he protested were to aid prisoners' families) and was imprisoned ultimately at Plotzensee Prison in Berlin.  He and six others arrested with him were executed by beheading at the prison after being sentenced to death.

References

External links
 

1889 births
1943 deaths
Austrian footballers
Association football midfielders
Austria international footballers
Place of birth missing
Austro-Hungarian military personnel of World War I
Austrian social democrats
Austrian communists
Austrian people executed by Nazi Germany
People executed by guillotine at Plötzensee Prison
Austrian people who died in the Holocaust
Austrian resistance members
Resistance members killed by Nazi Germany